Kyeintali Subtownship is divided from Gwa Township, Rakhine State. There are two Sub-Tsps at Thandwe District, Kyeintali Subtownship in Gwa and Maei Subtownship in Toungup. Government offices of Kyeintali Subtownship are located in Kyeintali

References

Populated places in Rakhine State